Littlenobody, founded by Karen Penman, is a small animation collective working from the South East of England.

Littlenobody Productions specialise in animation and have screened projects in competition at Bradford Animation Festival, Encounters Film Festival, Northern Lights Film Festival and Interfilm Berlin as well as Clermont-Ferrands Film market.

Represented by Ouat Media in Canada, with projects sold to A-one Films and The Short Film Channel Movieola.

Littlenobody were shortlisted down to the final 12 for the Virgin Media short competition meaning their first animated short What Cassandra Saw is BBFC certificated is screening in 212 cinemas UK wide from July 2008 till July 2009.  Littlenobody won the 4TALENT animation award for 2008 and featured in a double page spread in the 4Talent Magazine.

They were runners up in the 4mations Digital shorts South East Funding Scheme and completed Weather Beaten their second animated short for the Commonwealth Vision awards 2009, Final 10 in competition.

Most recently they have been awarded funding for their latest stop motion animated short I Wish I Were an Elephant from the UK Film Council, New Cinema Fund, Digital Shorts Scheme via regional screen agency Screen East.

Littlenobody Projects to date 

I Wish I Were an Elephant - Funded by Screen East & UK Film Council - September 2011
Ballad of a Poor Man - Music Video for Vaughn King - December 2009
Magpie - Short Film - September 2009
Weather Beaten - Short Film for Commonwealth Vision Awards - January 2009
Every Time I close my Eyes - Music Video for Clare Blackman - December 2008
Two Times, Three Times for - Music Video for Reason or Romanza - April 2008
Interduvet Yarns - Music Video for Hybernation - November 2007
What Cassandra Saw - Short Film - September 2007
Yeah, You can me my Muse - Music Video for Amplifico - August 2007
Visual for multimedia events - Shoplands with Sutton - July 2007
Thou Shalt Always Kill - Music Video for Dan le sac vs Scroobius Pip - April 2007
Music monkeys - Music Video for BB Music House - August 2006
Showreel Littlenobody For 2008

Littlenobody Festivals, Awards and Screenings to date 

Cambridge Film Festival 31st 2011 - EM Media Digital Shorts - I Wish I Were an Elephant
Animated Encounters 16th International Film Festival 2010 - Channel 4 Industry screening - I Wish I Were an Elephant
Nozstock Festival 2010 - Thou Shalt Always Kill & Interduvet Yarns, Herefordshire
4Talent Animation Award Channel 4 - 2008
Final 12 Virgin Media Shorts 2008 - What Cassandra Saw - Year tour in over 212 cinemas on 35mm
London Socialist Film Co-op screening 2008 - Thou Shalt Always Kill
Sundown Multimedia Night 2008 - What Cassandra Saw & Interduvet Yarns
ZEBRA Poetry Berlin Film Festival 2008 - Interduvet Yarns
Southend Six Festival 2008 - What Cassandra Saw
Clermont-Ferrand Shorts Market 2008 -  What Cassandra Saw & Thou shalt Always Kill
Northern Lights Film Festival 2007 - What Cassandra Saw
Envy Post - Industry screening 2007 - Thou Shalt Always Kill
Interfilm Berlin 2007 - Thou Shalt Always Kill
Encounters Bristol Short Film Festival 2007 - Thou Shalt Always Kill
The National Media Museum Bradford Animation Film Festival 2007 - Thou Shalt Always Kill,
Sutton with Shoplands in Rochford Festival 2007 - Visuals
LFS Leigh-on-Sea Film Society Film Festival 2007 - Thou Shalt Always Kill

Reviews 

The  4Talent Animation Award was judged by Ruth Fielding, Lupus Films and animation consultant to Channel 4, and Helen Brunsdon, Development Executive at Aardman who said regarding Littlenobody's portfolio “Stand out work with a real wow-factor. Impressive and diverse use of techniques and an ability to challenge the viewer and themselves. Given a chance and some decent budgets, you just know these two talented animators are going to go on to bigger and better things. We were also very impressed by their ability to self promote via their website.”.

Ian Lumsden World animation blogger adds "I first noticed their music video Thou Shalt Always Kill when I previewed the weekend's BAF 07. It was most professionally done. I was therefore impressed to discover it was produced by a fledgling studio. Also surprising is the diversity of work produced in a short period of time .........Sometimes the combination of live action and animation jars. This is decidedly not the case here. Filters, excellent lighting, interesting camera angles and stop motion techniques, together with animated twinkling effects lead naturally into the interspersed animated sections. Their website is developing apace and belies its short life........A perfect blend of traditional animation and eye popping contemporary film-making. Karen is a fizzing PR machine and it helps if you have quality to sell because they are pretty special in that department too .....There is a beauty bestowed on the scene and always there is an edgy magic to the production.  An imaginative, original approach."

References

External links 
I  Wish I Were an Elephant - Blog
Littlenobody double page spread in 4Talent Magazine
BBFC certificate What Cassandra Saw
4talent Magazine
Virgin Media Shorts - Shortlist
London Socialist Film Co-operative
Sundown Multimedia
Berlin Poetry Film Festival
Southend 6 Festival
What Cassandra Saw - Clermont Ferrad Film Festival page
Thou Shalt Always Kill - Clermont Ferrad Film Festival page
Northern Lights Film Festival
Envy Post Production House
Interfilm Berlin
Encounters Film Festival
National Media Museum
Sutton with Shoplands Festival
Leigh Film Society
Ian Lumsden Animation Blog

British animation studios
2004 establishments in England